Lipińskie Małe   is a village in the administrative district of Gmina Prostki, within Ełk County, Warmian-Masurian Voivodeship, in northern Poland.

The village has a population of 152.

References

Villages in Ełk County